In IT, a grey problem (or, gray problem) is a problem where the causing technology is unknown or unconfirmed.  Common grey problems are:

 Intermittent errors;
 Intermittent incorrect output, or;
 Transient performance problems.

Because the causing technology is not clear, IT departments often find it difficult to allocate the problem to a Technical Support Team (platform team).

Background 

Combining frequency and causing technology information can provide a view of the complexity of a problem and so indicate how difficult it will be to investigate (see Figure 1).

The problems in each quadrant have certain characteristics:

Quadrant 1 In a typical IT department 80 to 90% of problems are solid faults that are easily tracked down to a causing technology.  The appropriate technical or platform support team efficiently deals with these problems every day.

Quadrant 2 Some recurring problems are due to a Known Error, or are obviously being caused by a particular hardware or software component.  These problems are handled by technical support people working with suppliers.

Quadrant 3 Every so often a one-off problem occurs, and the cause of these may never be found.

Quadrant 4 The technical ownership of these issues is unclear and so they are referred to as “grey problems” i.e. not black and white.

Impact 

Grey problems have a significant impact on IT service, and:

 Form the bulk of ongoing recurring problems
 Create a disproportionately high IT support workload
 Give a pointer to more serious problems to come
 Cause the business to adjust practices around the problem

ITIL perspective 

ITIL Service Operations implies that grey problems should be handled through a Problem Solving Group under the direction of the Problem Management function.  In practice, even those IT organisations that have adopted ITIL rarely have a procedure to handle a grey problem, leaving it to bounce between Technical Support Teams as each denies that their technology is to blame.

See also
 ITIL, framwork with best practices for administering IT services and assets
 ITIL v3 Problem Management
 ITIL v3 Incident Management, 
 COBIT, a business-focused framework for information technology
 Rapid problem resolution diagnosis (RPR), problem diagnosis method designed to determine the root cause of IT problems

Further reading
 Offord, Paul (2011). RPR: A Problem Diagnosis Method for IT Professionals. Advance Seven Limited. .
 Grey problem case study
 Presentation to the British Computer Society

Information technology management